Swami Purushottamananda (14 June 1931 – 25 February 2005) was a monk of the Ramakrishna Mission. He was a prolific writer and orator in Kannada. He was also known as singer.

Biography

Birth 
Swami Purushottamananda was born on 14 June 1931 at Moodahadu, a village near Saligrama in the undivided district of Dakshina Kannada, Karnataka as Ramachandra Bayari. He completed matriculation and served as a teacher in Malpe and Madikeri.

Work as Sannyasi of Ramakrishna Mission 
He joined the Ramakrishna Order in 1960 as a brahmacharin at Sri Ramakrishna Ashrama (presently Ramakrishna Math), Bangalore. He was an initiated disciple of Swami Yatiswarananda, the then president of Sri Ramakrishna Ashrama, Bangalore and the Vice President of the Ramakrishna Order. He, as brahmachari Mukunda Chaitanya, underwent probationer's training at the Belur Math, headquarters of Ramakrishna Mission for two years.

He served at the Bangalore centre (now known as Ramakrishna Math, Basavanagudi) for about 33 years (up to 1993), managing several of its activities, including Vivekananda Balaka Sangha and Vivekananda Yuvaka Sangha (the twin organizations for the character development of youth).

During May 1993 – November 2000, Swami Purushottamananda served as the President of the Ramakrishna Saradashram at Ponnampet, Kodagu; and conducted a number of spiritual retreats and other programmes. The shrine and the prayer-halls were renovated and Sadhu-nivas (monks' quarters) constructed.

In November 2000 he took over as the President of the newly affiliated Ramakrishna Mission ashrama at Belgaum. The historic building in Belgaum, where Swami Vivekananda stayed in 1892 for 12 days, was gifted to the Ramakrishna Mission by the Govt. of Karnataka. Swami Purushottamananda was instrumental in renovating this building, and constructing the Ramakrishna Universal Temple in the adjacent land in January 2004.

He has authored several books, mainly in Kannada, including three biographies: on Ramakrishna, Sarada Devi and Swami Vivekananda. One of his famous books — A letter to a student, focuses on  students elaborating various techniques to help them achieve all-round excellence. The biography of Vivekananda won him the Vishwamanava literary award of the De.Ja.Gou. Trust.

The Swamiji was instrumental in the setting up of several voluntary organizations, Satsangs, as well as independent Ramakrishna Ashramas throughout Karnataka. He took a very active role in the Ramakrishna Mission activities — through his discourses, bhajans, and Satsang programmes. He is also well known for his singing and composing the bhajans, and for inspiring others to take monastic vows.

His music 
Swami Purushottamanandaji was a noted singer and could allegedly transport the satsang into a spiritual trance. The most notable Bhajanas sung by him were Shraddeya sarovaradi, Tayi durgeya, kabir doha "Theertha yaatrage" etc. His most well-known songs are:

Swami Purushottamananda : Sanyassi Geetay.
Ananta Roopini, Swami Purushottamananda
Swami Purushottamananda Bhajan : Prema Roopa Sri Ramakrishna

Death 
Swami Purushottamanandaji died on Friday 25 February 2005 at the Narayana Hrudayalaya, due to a massive heart attack at the age of 73.

Books, Cassettes and CDs

Books

In Kannada

Biographies 
 Veerasanyasi-, Vishwa Vijeta-, and Vishwamanava-Vivekananda – the three volumes of a comprehensive biography of Swami Vivekananda
 Yugavatara Shri Ramakrishna (Vol. I to Vol. IV) – a biography of Sri Ramakrishna in Kannada
 Shri Sharadadevi Jeevanaganga – a biography of the Holy Mother Shri Sharadadevi
 Brahmananubhavi – a biography of Swami Brahmananda

Booklets 
 ವಿದ್ಯಾರ್ಥಿಗೊಂದು ಪತ್ರ - Vidyarthigondu Patra
 ಆಧ್ಯಾತ್ಮದಲ್ಲಿ ಏಕಾಗ್ರತೆ - Adhyayanadalli Ekagrate
 Dheerateya Dundhubhi
 ಕಬೀರ ಬೀರಿದ ಬೆಳಕು - Kabeera Beerida Belaku
 ಸದ್ಯಕ್ಕೆ ಇಷ್ಟು ಸಾಕು - Sadyakke Ishtu Saaku (a minimalist Kannada dictionary for beginners)
 ತಪಸ್ಸು ಯಶಸ್ಸು - Tapassu Yashassu
 ಶಾಂತಿಯ ಹರಕೆ - Shaantiya Harake
 ಪ್ರಯತ್ನವೇ ಪರಮೇಶ್ವರ - Prayatnave Parameshwara
 ಶಕ್ತಿಶಾಲಿ ವ್ಯಕ್ತಿತ್ವ ನಿರ್ಮಾಣ - Shanktishaali Vyakthitva Nirmaana
 ಚಿಂತನ ಮಂಥನ - Chintana Manthana
 ಯುವ ಶಕ್ತಿಯ ರಹಸ್ಯ - Yuva Shaktiya Rahasya
 ವಿದ್ಯಾರ್ಥಿಗಾಗಿ - Vidhyaarthigaagi.
 ಶಾಂತಿಯ ಮಂತ್ರಗಳು - Shaanti Mantragalu.

English 
 Letter to A Student
 Secret of Concentration
 Man and Money
 Youth and Vitality
 Useful thoughts for youths
 Build your personality
 Gospel of Strength

Music in CDs and Cassettes 
 Prarthana Pushpanjali – recording of his live performance at Ramakrishna Institute of Culture, Kolkota
 Bhakthi Geetam – Live Performance at Ramakrishna math, Chennai
 Bhakthi Sudha – assorted bhajans and namavalis
 Bhajana Mala – assorted bhajans and namavalis
 Shiva Shakti Mala – Sanskrit and Hindi devotional songs
 Sri Ram Aradhana – Sanskrit and Hindi devotional songs
 Sri Krishna Bhajans – Sanskrit and Hindi devotional songs
 Bhajans(Vol-4) – Hindi devotional songs
 Bhajans(Vol-5) – Hindi and Sanskrit devotional songs
 Stotras and Bhajans
 Arati & Sankirtana – Sanskrit devotional songs
 Bhajanakusumanjali – Kannada & Hindi devotional songs
 Baarenna Thaayi – Kannada devotional songs
 Kabeera Beerida Belaku (vol. I & II) – Hindi & Kannada

Lectures in Audio Cassettes and CDs 
 Vachana-Veda (16 CDs)
 Vishnusahasranama (3 CDs)
 Tittiriya Upanishad (2 CDs)
 Bhakti Yoga (1 CD)
 Chintana Part 1 & 2 (2 CDs)
 Pavitrateyatta payaNa (1 CD)
 Manassinante Mahadeva
 Yugakke Takka Saadhane (1 CD)
 Vinoda-Sunaada (1 CD)
 Sarvatomukha BeLavaNige(1 CD)
 PrItiya Riti (1 CD)
 Dhyana Yoga (1 CD)
 Vishwaroopa Darshana (1 CD)
 Sarada Devi Sandesha (1 CD)
 Satsanga Sourabha Bhaga 1(1 CD)
 Satsanga Sourabha Bhaga 2(1 CD)
 Sri Sharadadevi Mahatmya (1 DVD audio)
 Prayatnave Parameshwara (1 CD)
 Bharata Pravaasa Kathana (1 CD)
 Adhyatma & Mantradeekshe (1 CD)

References

External links 

Video Collections
prarthana_pushpa
Satsanga – Swami Purushottamananda
A Day with Swami Purushottamananda – 1
A day with Swami Purushottamananda – 2
A Day with Swami Purushottamananda – 3.

Audio Collections
Collection at esnips
Sri Ramakrishna Vachanaveda Lecture Kannada
Bhajans by Swami Purushottamanandaji_Devi
Bhajans by Swami Purushottamanandaji_Rama
Bhajans by Swami Purushottamanandaji_Composed by Swamiji
Bhajans by Swami Purushottamanandaji_Vividh Bhajans
Bhajans by Swami Purushottamanandaji_Krishna
Bhajana Mala 1
Arati_and_Bhajans_Ramakrishna_Mission

Monks of the Ramakrishna Mission
1931 births
2005 deaths
People from Dakshina Kannada district